Aztec High School is a public high school in Aztec, New Mexico. The school colors are black and orange and the mascot is the Fighting Tiger.

In addition to Aztec, the district (and effectively the high school) also serves northern Bloomfield and the communities of Cedar Hill, Center Point, and La Boca. The district also includes most of Flora Vista, North Light Plant, and Spencerville, as well as portions of Crouch Mesa and Navajo Dam.

History
Until 1956, students from Bloomfield went to Aztec. In 1956 Bloomfield High School formed out of the town's junior high school.

School environment
The student-teacher ratio for full-time teachers is around 1:18, which is slightly higher than the New Mexico state average.

2017 shooting

On the morning of December 7, 2017, the San Juan County Sheriff's Department said they were responding to an active shooter on campus. The New Mexico State Police Twitter account confirmed that two students were killed by the gunman, who died as well.

References

External links
Official website

Public high schools in New Mexico
Schools in San Juan County, New Mexico